Powtoon Ltd. is a British company which sells cloud-based animation software (SaaS) for creating animated presentations and animated explainer videos. The name "Powtoon" is a portmanteau of the words "PowerPoint" (trademarked by Microsoft) and "Cartoon".

History 
Powtoon was founded in January 2012. The company released a beta version in August 2012. In December 2012, Powtoon secured $600,000 investment from Los Angeles-based venture capital firm Startup Minds.

Product 
Powtoon is a web-based animation software that allows users to create animated presentations by manipulating pre-created objects, imported images, provided music and user-created voice-overs. Powtoon uses an Apache Flex engine to generate an XML file that can be played in the Powtoon online viewer, exported to YouTube or downloaded as an MP4 file.

See also
 Animaker
 Inshot
 Vyond

References 

Animation software
Marketing companies established in 2012
Internet properties established in 2012
British companies established in 2012
Cloud applications
Presentation software
Companies based in the London Borough of Harrow